Mansfield Road Baptist Church is a Baptist church in Nottingham, England, UK. It is affiliated with the Baptist Union of Great Britain.

History
Mansfield Road Baptist Church has its origins in a split within the congregation of Stoney Street Baptist Church in Nottingham in 1849.

They built a new chapel on Milton Street which opened in 1851. In 1901 they were joined by the congregation of Broad Street Baptist Church. In 1912 they moved out to the current church which was newly built on the corner of Gregory Boulevard and Sherwood Rise. The Milton Street chapel was sold, and became a lecture hall for the adjacent Nottingham Mechanics' Institution.

Organ
The pipe organ was installed in 1913 by Norman and Beard. A specification of the organ can be found on the National Pipe Organ Register.

References

Baptist churches in Nottingham
Churches completed in 1913
1913 establishments in England